The Thompson's snake eel (Muraenichthys thompsoni) is an eel in the family Ophichthidae (worm/snake eels). It was described by David Starr Jordan and Robert Earl Richardson in 1908. It is a marine, tropical eel which is known from the western central Pacific Ocean, including Vietnam, Australia, and the Philippines.

References

Fish described in 1908
Muraneichthys
Taxa named by David Starr Jordan
Taxa named by Robert Earl Richardson